The 2018 World RX of Sweden was the sixth round of the fifth season of the FIA World Rallycross Championship. The event was held at the Höljesbanan in the village of Höljes, Värmland.

Qualifying

Semi-finals

Semi-Final 1

Semi-Final 2

Final

* — Mattias Ekström finished third but was later penalised for a final lap incident with Timmy Hansen

Standings after the event

 Note: Only the top five positions are included.

References

|- style="text-align:center"
|width="35%"|Previous race:2018 World RX of Norway
|width="40%"|FIA World Rallycross Championship2018 season
|width="35%"|Next race:2018 World RX of Canada
|- style="text-align:center"
|width="35%"|Previous race:2017 World RX of Sweden
|width="40%"|World RX of Sweden
|width="35%"|Next race:2019 World RX of Sweden
|- style="text-align:center"

Sweden
World RX
World RX